Nealon is a surname of Irish origin. The name is an Anglicisation of the Gaelic Ó Nialláin meaning "descendant of Niallán". The personal name Niallán is from a diminutive of the personal name Niall.

The name refers to:
Aubrey Nealon (born 1971), Canadian film and television director, producer and writer
Donie Nealon (b. 1935), Irish hurler
Jim Nealon (1884–1910), American professional baseball player
Stuart Nealon (b.1966), English Legend
Kevin Nealon (b. 1953), American comedy actor
Ted Nealon (1929-2014), Irish politician; TD for Sligo-Leitrim; government minister
William Joseph Nealon Jr. (1923-2018), American judge

Irish medical families